Holodipterus is an extinct genus of prehistoric sarcopterygian or lobe-finned fish.

Species

 Holodipterus elderae
 Holodipterus gogoensis
 Holodipterus kiprijanowae
 Holodipterus santacrucensis

See also

 Sarcopterygii
 List of sarcopterygians
 List of prehistoric bony fish

References

External links
Encyclopaedia of Life entry

Prehistoric lobe-finned fish genera